Voimedu is a village in Vedaranyam taluk, Nagapattinam district in Tamil Nadu, India. The ancient name of the village is 'Voimai' (Truth) 'medu' (place), but it changed gradually to 'Voimedu' by mispronunciation.

Demographics
Voimedu is an agriculturally based village with a population of above 5000.  There is a victory nursery and primary school.
There is also the Indian Bank located there.

References
2. https://leegroups.webs.com/ LEE Group's Chinthai
Villages in Nagapattinam district

லீ குழுமம்